Adam Stevens may refer to:

Adam Stevens (Neighbours)
Adam Stevens (NASCAR)
Adam Stevens (hip hop artist)

See also
Adam Stephens (disambiguation)